Zdeněk Psotka (born 18 November 1973) is a Czech former football player who currently works as a sport director for SK Sigma Olomouc.

He was announced as the new manager of the Olomouc first team in May 2008, replacing caretaker manager Jiří Fryš. After three and a half years in charge, Psotka was sacked in November 2011 with Olomouc at the bottom of the Gambrinus liga.

References

External links
 Profile at idnes.cz 

1973 births
Living people
Sportspeople from Olomouc
Czech footballers
Czechoslovak footballers
Czech football managers
Czech First League managers
FK Senica managers
Slovak Super Liga managers
SK Sigma Olomouc managers
Association football goalkeepers